Novosheshminsk (Yaña Çişmä) is a rural locality (a selo) and the administrative center of Novosheshminsky District of the Republic of Tatarstan, Russia. Population:

References

Notes

Sources

Rural localities in Tatarstan
Chistopolsky Uyezd